Admete frigida is a species of sea snail, a marine gastropod mollusk in the family Cancellariidae, the nutmeg snails.

Description
The shell grows to a length of 7 mm.

Distribution
This marine species occurs in the Magellanic Straits.

References

External links
 Rochebrune A.-T. de & Mabille J. (1885). Diagnoses de mollusques nouveaux, recueillis par les membres de la mission du Cap Horn et M. Lebrun, Préparateur au Muséum, chargé d'une mission à Santa-Cruz de Patagonie. Bulletin de la Société Philomathique de Paris. ser. 7, 9(3): 100–111
 Hemmen J. (2007) Recent Cancellariidae. Annotated and illustrated catalogue of Recent Cancellariidae. Privately published, Wiesbaden. 428 pp. [With amendments and corrections taken from Petit R.E. (2012) A critique of, and errata for, Recent Cancellariidae by Jens Hemmen, 2007. Conchologia Ingrata 9: 1–8

Cancellariidae
Gastropods described in 1885